Pribylov is a Russian masculine surname, its feminine counterpart is Pribylova. It may refer to
Gavriil Pribylov (died 1796), Russian navigator 
Miroslava Pribylova (born 1970), Canadian volleyball player

See also
Pribilof Islands

Russian-language surnames